Fishflies are members of the subfamily Chauliodinae, belonging to the megalopteran family Corydalidae. They are most easily distinguished from their closest relatives, dobsonflies, by the jaws (mandibles) and antennae. In contrast to the large jaws (especially in males) of dobsonflies, fishfly mandibles are not particularly noticeable or distinctive, and the males have feathery antennae similar to many large moths. Chauliodes pectinicornis, the "summer fishfly", is a well-known species in North America.

Fishflies lay their eggs upon vegetation overhanging streams, whence the larvae, as soon as hatched, drop into the water, and go about preying upon aquatic animals. When ready to transform to pupae, they crawl out upon the bank and are then found in cavities under stones or even under the bark of trees.

They will eat aquatic plants as well as small animals including vertebrates like minnows and tadpoles, and may live up to seven days as adults. Their entire lifespan is several years, but most of this time is spent as larvae.

There are about 15 genera with nearly 110 species. The New World genera include Dysmicohermes, Orohermes, Neohermes, Nothochauliodes, Protochauliodes, Archichauliodes, Chauliodes and Nigronia. Three genera are endemic to the Afrotropical Realm and are found in Madagascar and South Africa - Platychauliodes, Madachauliodes and Taeniochauliodes. Archichauliodes and Protochauli-odes found in the Australian Realm. The genera endemic to the Oriental Realm are Anachauliodes, Ctenochauliodes, Neochauliodes and Parachauliodes.

Extinct genera 

 †Cretochaulus Ponomarenko 1976 Zaza Formation, Gidarinskaya Formation, Russia, Early Cretaceous (Aptian)
 †Eochauliodes Liu et al. 2012 Daohugou, China, Middle/Late Jurassic
 †Jurochauliodes Wang and Zhang 2010 Daohugou, China, Middle/Late Jurassic

References

External links
 
 BugGuide.net
 InsectIdentification.org
 University of Kentucky
 University of Virginia
 InsectIdentification.org Fishfly photos

Corydalidae
Aquatic insects
Insect subfamilies